Mark Arazo Bautista (born August 10, 1983) is a Filipino singer, actor and commercial model. Bautista received his career break when he became a grand finalist on the Philippine reality TV talent search Star for a Night where he placed third behind Sarah Geronimo.

Life and career

Early life
Bautista was born to Leon Darni Bautista III and Susan Arazo Bautista in Cagayan de Oro, Philippines. Bautista was determined to help his family when his father was forced to stop working because of his physical condition. He has four siblings–an older brother (Ryan Oneal), a sister (Princess Alodia) and two younger brothers (Nigel Adrian and Jan Reil). With the cash prizes he won at singing competitions, he was able to help his parents through their financial difficulties.

In his early years, he was so shy that he didn't really much show his singing talent. His confidence began growing once he started joining different oratorical competitions. He even bagged the first prize in some of those oratorical competitions.

He joined a band called Voizemale which did various gigs in Cagayan de Oro, mostly covering popular hits of Earth, Wind & Fire and Backstreet Boys. He further developed his confidence by joining various singing competitions. Close friends of Bautista persuaded him to audition for a singing contest in ABS-CBN's MTB. While that wasn't his calling to stardom, he continued to sing and improve his singing skills.

When the Star for a Night competition came, money became a problem, and he thought that he was going to miss this big opportunity. His mother provided him with money to go to Cebu as a birthday gift. He then went to Manila to finish the audition process. He passed all three levels of the Star for a Night auditions and made it to the grand finals. He said: "I can never forget that experience. That, plus the exposure, was enough to make me happy". At the end of the show, he placed as 1st runner-up next to Sarah Geronimo, the grand champion of the show.

2003–2009
In 2004, when he signed a contract with ABS-CBN, thus becoming a regular performer in ASAP and host of the Search for the Star in a Million (season 1 and season 2) singing competition as well as Star Magic.

In September 2005, he released his first album Dream On with its carrier single "I Need You" which topped the MYX daily top 10 for two months. Due to the success of his first album, Viva Records released a full-length album called Dream On Expanded along with the release of the "You Win the Game" music video that featured a new and daring Mark. The song reached the top spot in MYX in less than a week after it premiered.

On March 24, 2006, Bautista had his first solo major concert at the Aliw Theater, dubbed as 'Pop Heartthrob'.

2010–2013
In 2010, he signed a four-year exclusive contract with GMA Network. He became a regular performer on Party Pilipinas, made a cameo appearance in Diva and had a lead role in a primetime drama series.

In July 2011, he, along with other Kapuso artists such as Iza Calzado (who later transferred to ABS-CBN) and Aljur Abrenica, performed for the Kababayan Fest held in Northern and Southern California. Additionally, he made a special appearance with Aljur Abrenica for a meet-and-greet at Seafood City Markets. This special performance and visit was to promote GMA Pinoy TV and the launching of GMA Life TV. In the same year, he performed as Crisóstomo Ibarra in the stage musical Noli Me Tángere, an adaptation of José Rizal's novel of the same name by composer Ryan Cayabyab and librettist Bienvenido Lumbera.

As of 2014, Bautista is currently performing in the musical Here Lies Love by David Byrne and Fatboy Slim at the Royal National Theatre in London where he plays the late President Ferdinand Marcos. The musical is based on the life of Imelda Marcos. Bautista is scheduled to reprise the role in the show for the Seattle production.

2018–present
He returned to GMA as one of the performers of a new Musical Variety show, Studio 7.

Personal life
Bautista stated in a 2008 interview that he was courting Sarah Geronimo.

Discography

Albums

Notes
 A^ Dream On Expanded was first released as a six-track EP on September 13, 2005, entitled Dream On, before it was re-released as a studio album.

Singles

Guest appearances

Other appearances

Filmography

Film

Television

Awards and nominations

References

External links
Official website

1981 births
Bisexual male actors
Bisexual musicians
English-language singers from the Philippines
Filipino male musical theatre actors
Filipino male television actors
21st-century Filipino male singers
GMA Network personalities
Filipino LGBT musicians
Filipino LGBT singers
LGBT models
Living people
Male actors from Misamis Oriental
Participants in Philippine reality television series
People from Cagayan de Oro
Singers from Misamis Oriental
ABS-CBN personalities
Star Magic
Viva Records (Philippines) artists
Viva Artists Agency
Filipino male film actors
Filipino LGBT actors
Filipino television personalities
Filipino television presenters
Filipino television variety show hosts